Geranylgeranyltransferase type 1 or simply geranylgeranyltransferase is one of the three enzymes in the prenyltransferase group. In specific terms, Geranylgeranyltransferase (GGTase 1) adds a 20-carbon isoprenoid called a geranylgeranyl group to proteins bearing a CaaX motif: a four-amino acid sequence at the carboxyl terminal of a protein. Geranylgeranyltransferase inhibitors are being investigated as anti-cancer agents.

Function 

Prenyltransferases, including geranylgeranyltransferase, posttranslationally modify proteins by adding an isoprenoid lipid called a prenyl group to the carboxyl terminus of the target protein. This process, called prenylation, causes prenylated proteins to become membrane-associated due to the hydrophobic nature of the prenyl group. Most prenylated proteins are involved in cellular signaling, wherein membrane association is critical for function.

Structure 
Geranylgeranyltransferase contains two subunits, α and β that are encoded by the FNTA and PGGT1B genes, respectively. Both subunits are composed primarily of alpha helices. Geranylgeranyltransferase coordinates a zinc cation on its β subunit at the lip of the active site. Geranylgeranyltransferase has a hydrophobic binding pocket for geranylgeranyl diphosphate, the lipid donor molecule. All Geranylgeranyltransferase substrates invariably have a cysteine as their fourth-to-last residue. This cysteine, coordinated by the zinc, engages in an SN2 type attack on the geranylgeranyl diphosphate, displacing the diphosphate.

See also
 Farnesyltransferase
 Prenylation
 Rab geranylgeranyltransferase – Geranylgeranyltransferase type 2

References

Further reading